Portlandite is a hydroxide-bearing mineral typically included in the oxide mineral class. It is the naturally occurring form of calcium hydroxide (Ca(OH)2) and the calcium analogue of brucite (Mg(OH)2).

Occurrence
Portlandite occurs in a variety of environments. At the type location in Northern Ireland it occurs as an alteration of calc–silicate rocks by contact metamorphism of larnite–spurrite. It occurs as fumarole deposits in the Vesuvius area. In Jebel Awq, Oman it occurs as precipitates from an alkaline spring emanating from ultramafic bedrock. In the Chelyabinsk coal basin of Russia it is produced by combustion of coal seams and similarly by spontaneous combustion of bitumen in the Hatrurim Formation of the Negev desert in Israel and the Maqarin area, Jordan. It also occurs in the manganese mining area of Kuruman, Cape Province, South Africa in the Kalahari Desert where it occurs as large crystals and masses.

It occurs in association with afwillite, calcite, larnite, spurrite, halite, brownmillerite, hydrocalumite, mayenite and ettringite.

It was first described in 1933 for an occurrence at Scawt Hill, Larne, County Antrim, Northern Ireland. It was named portlandite because the chemical calcium hydroxide is a common hydrolysis product of Portland cement.

References 

Calcium minerals
Hydroxide minerals
Trigonal minerals
Minerals in space group 164